The Associated RC18T is a 1:18 scale, ready-to-run electric stadium truck made by Associated Electrics of Lake Forest, California.  A mechanically similar monster truck version with slightly different bodywork similar to the 1:8 scale, nitromethane-powered  Associated "Monster GT" and all-terrain tires with unique "AE" tread pattern is sold as the RC18MT.

Both ready-to-run versions feature four wheel drive, fifteen sealed ball bearings, Associated "XPS" micro electronic speed control and oil-filled shock absorbers.  A 370-series motor is standard on the T and MT.  A full-sized Associated "XP2" two-channel pistol grip radio is standard as well.

Though both models are race-ready as delivered, a more serious version was released.  This is the "Factory Team" RC18T, available in kit form only, intended as a pure competition vehicle and packed with "Factory Team" upgrades as standard.  Associated lists these upgrades as:

Blue-anodized aluminum "dogbone" drive axles
Blue aluminum finned motor mount
Carbide differential balls
Woven graphite battery strap
Blue aluminum threaded shock absorbers
Blue aluminum wheel nuts
Titanium turnbuckles
Extra servo saver for use with Hitec brand radio systems
12-tooth, 13-tooth and 14-tooth motor pinion gears to assist in tuning for different track conditions and motors

The popularity of 1:18 scale monster trucks was spurred by the development of the Team Losi Mini-T, the original 1:18 scale mini monster truck.

The RC18T platform continued until 2010:
20100 RC18T, 2004
20105 RC18B RTR 1:18 scale 4WD buggy, 2005
20110 RC18MT, 2005
20102 Factory Team RC18T kit, 2005
20107 Factory Team 18B, 2006
20115 20116, 20117 RC18R, 2006
20118 RC18R Niteline RTR, 2007
20106 RC18B2 2.4GHz RTR, 2010
20108 RC18B2 Brushless RTR, 2010
20103 RC18T2/B2 Team Kit, 2010
20130 RC18 Late Model RTR, 2010
20101 RC18T2 2.4GHz RTR, 2010
20104 RC18T2 Brushless RTR, 2010

Chassis specifications (18T/18MT)

Length:  218 mm/225 mm
Width:  182 mm/188 mm
Wheelbase:  154 mm
Internal gear ratio:  2.5:1
Weight (with body)::  540 g
Four wheel drive transfer system:  Shaft drive via blue-anodized aluminum drive shaft

External links
Official RC18T website
Official RC18MT website
Official listing of Team Associated vehicles, including RC18 models

RC18T